Labyrinthus umbrus is a species of air-breathing land snail, a terrestrial pulmonate gastropod mollusk in the family Labyrinthidae.

This taxon was described as Labyrinthus umbrus by Fred Gilbert Thompson from Rancho Grande, Aragua in Venezuela in 1957.

Alan Solem considered this taxon as a subspecies Labyrinthus leucodon umbrus in 1966.

Distribution 
This species occurs in:
 Venezuela
 El Hatillo Municipality, Miranda, Venezuela

References

Labyrinthidae
Gastropods described in 1957